Al Sunbula Stadium is a football specific stadium in Al Diwaniyah, Iraq, that is currently under construction. Once completed, it will be used mostly for football matches and will host the home matches of Al-Diwaniya FC as a replacement for their venue Al-Diwaniya Stadium. The stadium will have a capacity of 30,000 spectators and will cost approximately $100 million USD funded entirely by Iraqi government.

The basic concrete structure of the stadium was built between December 2012 and May 2014, but work was then halted for financial reasons. Work stopped at a progress rate of 57%. Despite economic challenges, efforts are being made by the Ministry of Youth and Sports to resume work in order to complete the project.

Design
The project includes a main stadium that can accommodate 30,000 spectators, two training fields of 2000 and 500 spectators respectively, a 4-star hotel with 75 rooms, a store, a parking lot and landscaping areas. The entire complex is being built on an area of approximately 250,000 sqm.

See also
List of football stadiums in Iraq

References

Football venues in Iraq
Stadiums under construction